Ian Archibald (born c. 1941) is an Australian taxidermist responsible for the preparation of animal specimens exhibited in Australian museums.

Works 
Ian Archibald was not formally trained in taxidermy, instead researching the techniques and receiving correspondence and direct training from experts overseas. Archibald is noted as the creator of a large crocodile specimen in 1979, early in his career, made internationally famous as a promotion for the Northern Territory in the aftermath of Cyclone Tracy. This model, Sweetheart, remained as a permanent exhibition at the Museum and Art Gallery of the Northern Territory for the next forty years.

He was involved in the intricate reconstruction of a Dromornis stirtoni specimen, excavated at the Alcoota fossil site and a featured exhibition at the Museum of Central Australia; Archibald is reported as preparing most of the animal material at that museum.

Honours 
A fossil species Mutpuracinus archibaldi was named by Peter F. Murray and Dirk Megirian for Archibald, a Miocene thylacinid described in 2000 from specimens found at Bullock Creek in the Territory.

References 

Taxidermists
Australian curators
1940s births
Living people